Harry Chandler Elliott (-1978) was a naturalized American physician and writer of science fiction.

Biography
Elliott was educated at the University of Toronto where he received a B.A. in 1930 and a M.A. in 1935.  His specialty was neuroanatomy, which he taught at the University of Nebraska School of Medicine.  His science fiction stories appeared in the magazines Galaxy Science Fiction, Beyond Fantasy Fiction and Astounding.  His novel Reprieve from Paradise was published by Gnome Press in 1955.

References

External links
 

Archival papers held at University of Toronto Archives and Records Management Services

References 

1909 births
1978 deaths
20th-century American novelists
American male novelists
American science fiction writers
American anatomists
American male short story writers
20th-century American short story writers
20th-century American male writers
Canadian emigrants to the United States